Oben ohne  ("topless") is an Austrian television series. It is about two families of tenants seeking to avoid eviction from their flats.

See also
List of Austrian television series

External links
 

2007 Austrian television series debuts
2011 Austrian television series endings
2000s Austrian television series
2010s Austrian television series
ORF (broadcaster)
German-language television shows